In geometry, the small retrosnub icosicosidodecahedron (also known as a retrosnub disicosidodecahedron, small inverted retrosnub icosicosidodecahedron, or retroholosnub icosahedron) is a nonconvex uniform polyhedron, indexed as . It has 112 faces (100 triangles and 12 pentagrams), 180 edges, and 60 vertices. It is given a Schläfli symbol sr{⁵/₃,³/₂}

The 40 non-snub triangular faces form 20 coplanar pairs, forming star hexagons that are not quite regular. Unlike most snub polyhedra, it has reflection symmetries.

George Olshevsky nicknamed it the yog-sothoth (after the Cthulhu Mythos deity).

Convex hull 

Its convex hull is a nonuniform truncated dodecahedron.

Cartesian coordinates 
Cartesian coordinates for the vertices of a small retrosnub icosicosidodecahedron are all the even permutations of

 (±(1-ϕ−α), 0, ±(3−ϕα))
 (±(ϕ-1−α), ±2, ±(2ϕ-1−ϕα))
 (±(ϕ+1−α), ±2(ϕ-1), ±(1−ϕα))
where ϕ = (1+)/2 is the golden ratio and α = .

See also 
 List of uniform polyhedra
 Small snub icosicosidodecahedron

References

External links 
 
 

Uniform polyhedra